Robert Valetini (born 3 September 1998) is an Australian rugby union player who plays as a back row forward for the Brumbies in Super Rugby. He has also been capped for Australia.

Early life 
The son of Fijian parents – father Manueli Valetini and mother Finau Valetini – the Melbourne-born Robert Valetini attended Westall Secondary College. He played representative rugby for Victorian state teams at under-16, under-18 and under-20 levels. A broken leg in his last year at school meant he missed a chance at selection for the 2016 Australian Schoolboys team, but he was called up to play for the Melbourne Rising in the National Rugby Championship (NRC) later that season.

Professional career 
While still at school, Valetini signed an Extended Playing Squad contract with the Brumbies for the 2017 season. His parents told him the move to Canberra would give him valuable life experience and he was just the second Australian rugby forward to sign a Super Rugby contract while still a schoolboy.

Valetini did not play much rugby in the early part of his first year due to hand and ankle injuries, but he joined the  team to play in the 2017 World Championship in Georgia. In 2017, Valetini signed a two-year full-time Super Rugby contract with the Brumbies until 2019, before playing NRC for the Canberra Vikings in 2017.

Valetini was heavily involved with the Wallabies in 2020 and 2021, appearing against New Zealand, South Africa and Argentina.

References

External links 
 Rob Valetini at Wallabies
 Rob Valetini at ItsRugby.co.uk
 Rob Valetini at ESPNscrum

1998 births
Australian people of Fijian descent
Australian people of Scottish descent
Australian rugby union players
Australia international rugby union players
ACT Brumbies players
Rugby union flankers
Rugby union number eights
Living people
Melbourne Rising players
Canberra Vikings players
Rugby union players from Melbourne